Big Beat Presents David Vanian and the Phantom Chords is a 1995 album by British rock band Dave Vanian and the Phantom Chords.

Track listing 
 "Voodoo Doll" (Clyde Dempsey, Roman Jugg, Brendan Mooney) — 3:23
 "Screamin' Kid" (Roman Jugg) — 3:31
 "Big Town" (David Vanian) — 4:43
 "This House Is Haunted" (Basil Adlam, Billy Rose) — 2:17
 "You and I" (Dave Gonzales) — 4:06
 "Whiskey and Me" (Donagh O'Leary) — 3:53
 "Fever in My Blood" (Brendan Mooney) — 3:03
 "Frenzy" (David Hill, Bobby Stevenson) — 1:48
 "Shooting Jones (Blue Eyes, Black Heart)" (Brendan Mooney) — 4:42
 "Jezebel" (Wayne Shanklin) — 2:49
 "Tonight We Ride" (David Vanian) — 3:20
 "Johnny Guitar" (Peggy Lee, Victor Young) — 2:43
 "Chase the Wild Wind" (David Vanian) — 4:14
 "Swamp Thing" (Roman Jugg, David Vanian) — 5:11

Personnel
David Vanian - vocals
Roman Jugg - lead guitar
Brendan Mooney - rhythm guitar
Steve Lawrence - bass
Donaugh O'Leary - bass
Clyde Dempsey - drums
Benji Le Fevre - producer

External links
[ Page and review, AMG]
Official page, Ace Records

Sources
Idiotbox, full Phantom Chords discography

1995 debut albums
Dave Vanian and the Phantom Chords albums